Eric, or, Little by Little is a book by Frederic W. Farrar, first edition 1858. It was published by Adam & Charles Black, Edinburgh and London. The book deals with the descent into moral turpitude of a boy at a boarding school or English public school of that era.

The author's preface to the fourth edition reads:

Summary 
Eric Williams is a son of a British colonial official and his wife stationed in India. As was common at the time of the British Raj, Eric is sent to Britain to be educated at a boarding school—in this case Roslyn School, where he encounters the good and bad aspects of the traditional  public school.

He slowly gets beaten down by being punished erroneously for wrongdoings, getting bullied and such things as drinking, smoking and cheating. The end is tragic for Eric, as he loses everything.

Background and reception
Along with Talbot Baines Reed's The Fifth Form at St. Dominic's and Thomas Hughes' Tom Brown's Schooldays, this book was one of three most popular boys' books in mid-Victorian Britain. The school is a thinly disguised cross between Farrar's own school King William's College in the Isle of Man, and Marlborough College, at which he was the master.

The book is credited with helping to increase the popularity of the first name "Eric" in English-speaking countries—although not with Eric Arthur Blair (the writer and journalist George Orwell) who disliked his given name because of its association with Farrar's book.

In later years, it fell out of favour, in part because of its religious earnestness.  For example, in Rudyard Kipling's Stalky & Co., published late in 1899, the protagonist Beetle and his friends frequently made fun of "Eric", e.g.

E. Nesbit included it in a list of didactic children's books which were "impossible to read."

Notes

References
 Carpenter, Humphrey and Mari Prichard. Oxford Companion to Children's Literature. Oxford University Press, 1997. 
 Zipes, Jack (ed) et al. The Norton Anthology of Children's Literature: The Traditions in English.  W. W. Norton, 2005. 
 Zipes, Jack (ed.). The Oxford Encyclopedia of Children's Literature. Volumes 1-4. Oxford University Press, 2006. 
 Watson, Victor, The Cambridge Guide to Children's Books in English. Cambridge University Press, 2001. 
 Demmers, Patricia (ed). From Instruction to Delight: An Anthology of Children's Literature to 1850, Oxford University Press, 2003. Oxford University Press. .
 St. John, Judith. The Osborne Collection of Early Children's Books, 1566-1910, A Catalogue, Toronto Public Library.

External links

 Project Gutenberg edition
 PDF edition at Internet Archive
 British Library: Children's Literature
 British Library: Integrated Catalogue.
 Copac: Academic & National Library Catalogue at the University of Manchester.
 Library of Congress Online Catalog
 National Union Catalog of Manuscript Collections

British children's novels
19th-century British children's literature
1858 British novels
A & C Black books
Novels set in boarding schools
Victorian novels
1850s children's books
English novels